Home at Last combines No More Night (1985) and Favorite Hymns (1989). As No More Night was not released on CD at the time, this compilation album is the only available CD release of that album.

Track listing

 "Tall Oak Tree" (Dorsey Burnette) - 3:07
 "Good Side Of Tomorrow" (Dave Loggins) - 2:25
 "What A Friend We Have In Jesus" (Trad. Scriven/Converse) - 3:08
 "Jesus Is His Name" (T.J. Kuenster) - 2:16
 "Softly And Tenderly" (Trad. Will Thompson) - 3:45
 "I Surrender All" (Trad. VanDeVenter/Weedon) - 3:11
 "Before There Could Be Me" (Jimmy Webb) - 2:17
 "I See Love" (Micheal Smotherman) - 2:33
 "Suffer Little Children" (Micheal Smotherman) - 4:15  (duet with Johnny Cash)
 "Overflow" (Wayne Berry) - 3:01
 "Trust In God And Do The Right" (Arr. Glen Campbell) - 2:45
 "The Lord's Prayer" (Albert Hay Malotte/Chappell) - 2:21
 "Suddenly There's A Valley" (Chuck Meyer/Biff Jones) - 2:55
 "In The Garden" (C. Austin Miles/Rodeheaver) - 3:59
 "You Ask Me How I Know" (Arr. by Glen Campbell) - 3:07
 "Standing On The Promises" (Trad. Carter) - 2:32
 "Sweet Hour Of Prayer" (Trad. Walford/Bradbury) - 3:06
 "Who Will Sing One More Song" (Arr. by Glen Campbell) - 2:12
 "Farther Along" (W.B. Stevens/Stamps/Baxter) - 3:45
 "No More Night" (Walt Harrah) - 4:01
 "When All Of God's Singers Get Home" (Arr. Glen Campbell) - 3:12
 "Sweet By And By" (Traditional) - 2:44

Personnel
Glen Campbell - vocals, guitar
T.J. Kuenster - piano
Craig Fall - acoustic guitars and electric guitars
Brent Rowan - electric guitar
Craig Thomas - guitar
Kim Darigan - bass guitar 
Mike Brignardello - bass guitar
Steve Turner- drums
Shane Keister - synthesizer
Dave Huntsinger - synthesizer
Strings - The "A" Strings
Background vocals - Woodmont Baptist Choir, Steve Stenmann, Joe Morecell, Brenda Jewell, Howard Jewell, J.J. Lee, David Danner, Becky Naish, Lois Holland, Ken Holland, Dennis Worley, Karla Worley, Peggy Arther, Bergen White, Diane Tidwell, Lisa Silver

Production
Executive producer - Paul Davis
Producers - Glen Campbell, Ken Harding, Marty Paich
Engineers - Tom Knox, Al Schimdt, Jim Cotton, Rick McCollister, Joe Scaife, Lee Peterzell, Joe Funderburk, Greg Parker, Paul Goldberg
Mastered at the Bullpen, Liscomb Park, Soulbury, Bucks, England 
String arrangements - Bergen White
Conductor and arranger - Marty Paich

1997 compilation albums
Glen Campbell compilation albums